Santiurde de Toranzo is a municipality of Cantabria. The Pas River runs through it.

Towns within the municipality
 Acereda
 Bárcena
 Iruz
 Pando
 Penilla
 San Martín
 Santiurde de Toranzo (Capital)
 Vejorís
 Villasevil

References

External links
  Ayunt. de Santiurde Toranzo

Municipalities in Cantabria